United Nations Security Council resolution 1475, adopted unanimously on 14 April 2003, after reaffirming all resolutions on the situation in Cyprus, particularly Resolution 1250 (1999), the Council regretted the failure to reach agreement on a settlement plan for the country, due to the "negative approach" of the Turkish Cypriot leadership.

The resolution reiterated the importance of achieving an overall political settlement in Cyprus and commended the Secretary-General Kofi Annan for using his initiative to present a settlement plan to lessen the differences between the Republic of Cyprus and Northern Cyprus. It regretted the approach of the Turkish Cypriot leadership that delayed a possible agreement on a plan for simultaneous referendums denying the Turkish and Greek Cypriots a chance to decide themselves, which meant there would be no conclusion before 16 April 2003 when Cyprus' accession to the European Union would be signed. The Council had described the Secretary-General's plan as providing a "unique basis" for further talks.

The Security Council supported Kofi Annan's plan of 26 February 2003 and called upon all concerned to negotiate within the framework of his good offices.

See also
 Annan Plan for Cyprus
 Cyprus dispute
 List of United Nations Security Council Resolutions 1401 to 1500 (2002–2003)
 United Nations Buffer Zone in Cyprus
 United Nations Peacekeeping Force in Cyprus
 Turkish invasion of Cyprus

References

External links
 
Text of the Resolution at undocs.org

 1475
 1475
2003 in Cyprus
2000s in Cypriot politics
April 2003 events